George Ryan (born 1934) is an American politician, governor of Illinois, 1999–2003.

George Ryan may also refer to:

 George Ryan (Irish-Danish businessman) (1783 or 1785 1865), Danish businessman and plantation owner
George Ryan (Canadian politician) (1806–1876), member of the Canadian House of Commons
Sir George Ryan (businessman) (born 1934), Antiguan businessperson